Interferon alpha-8 is a protein that in humans is encoded by the IFNA8 gene.

References

Further reading